Wyoming was a Chicago, Burlington and Quincy Railroad station in Wyoming, Illinois. Now the headquarters of the Rock Island Trail State Park, the building is listed on the National Register of Historic Places as the Chicago, Burlington & Quincy Railroad Depot. The station has also been restored to the original red color.

Train service
Wyoming was on the CB&Q's line between Buda and Elmwood, Illinois. The 44 and a half mile line was built by the Dixon, Peoria and Hannibal Railroad, and was bought by the CB&Q in 1899. The Buda-Elmwood branch of the railroad, which by that time had become the Burlington Northern Railroad, was torn out in 1984.  The station is near the former Peoria and Rock Island Railroad line, between the Quad Cities and Peoria. That 86 mile line was operated by the Chicago, Rock Island and Pacific Railroad and did not utilize the CB & Q depot.  Furthermore, after the Great Depression the CRI & P ceased to offer passenger service on its line, and that line itself was abandoned in 1963.

Rock Island Trail
Wyoming Station is the headquarters of the Rock Island Trail State Park, which maintains the right-of-way between Alta and Toulon. The building also serves as a visitor center and railroad museum for the town.

References

External links
Picture 1
Picture 2

Former railway stations in Illinois
Wyoming
Railroad museums in Illinois
National Register of Historic Places in Stark County, Illinois
Railway stations on the National Register of Historic Places in Illinois